Aciurina thoracica is a species of tephritid or fruit flies in the genus Aciurina of the family Tephritidae. It induces galls on plants from the genus Baccharis.

Distribution
United States, Mexico.

References

Tephritinae
Insects described in 1932
Diptera of North America
Gall-inducing insects